Jardin secret is the sixth studio album by Belgian singer Axelle Red. It was released in October 2006.

"Temps pour Nous" was the first single released from the Jardin Secret.

Track listing

 "Temps pour nous" — 3:16
 "Changer ma vie" — 3:17
 "Perles de pluie" — 4:02
 "Jure!" — 2:47
 "Pas compliquer" — 3:28
 "Si tu savais (Janelle)" — 3:42
 "Papillon" — 4:34
 "Utopie" — 4:43
 "Romantique à mort" — 3:23
 "Ce dont le monde a besoin" — 3:30
 "Naïve" — 3:16
 "Jardin secret" — 4:18
 "Fruit défendu" — 1:33

Charts

Certifications

References

Axelle Red albums
2006 albums